The Facilities Society was founded in the UK on 9 December 2008 as a not-for-profit company limited by guarantee (registered in England nr. 6769050). The Society is dedicated to interdisciplinary and cross-sector academic enterprise to support the needs of the academic community, UK government, businesses, and the public at large. In its role as a learned society, it complements established institutes and the universities.

The driver for the Society's founding was the absence of a natural home for research into the creation, upgrading and sustainable use of facilities and the related dissemination of findings and knowledge in public and political forums in order to influence policy and practice. Other bodies, institutes and associations acknowledge an interest in facilities, for example in terms of their asset value or operational management. None adopt an interdisciplinary, cross-sector perspective, where the subject of interest is facilities and not the interests of a particular discipline or profession.

The need for a focus on the operational performance of facilities is evident in UK government initiatives, such as the Carbon Trust, which is helping to focus attention on actions to improve the energy efficiency of existing buildings and other constructed facilities and thus reduce carbon emissions. The Society's research agenda includes measures to reduce embodied and operational carbon in facilities of all kinds.

Role
Promote, support and conduct interdisciplinary research, studies and other enquiries into creating, upgrading and sustaining facilities and seek grants, awards, fellowships, scholarships or other financial assistance from central and local government or other public bodies and place the results in the UK public domain.
Promote the use and uptake of research results and knowledge in public and political forums so as to influence policy and practice by providing advice and informed opinion on creating, upgrading and sustaining facilities.
Publish or sponsor academic journals related to creating, upgrading and sustaining facilities.
Organise and hold meetings, conferences, lectures, exhibitions, displays and demonstrations and make like arrangements for the dissemination of information related to creating, upgrading and sustaining facilities.

Definitions
A facility is defined as a physical construct and asset that is designed, engineered and operated to serve a particular function and to fulfil a need or provide a service, such as a building, installation, system or network.

Facilities are needed for living, working, healthcare, education, industrial production, commercial development, retailing, utilities, transportation and other infrastructure, sports and leisure, entertainment and communication, and are often collectively referred to as the built environment.

See also
Design management - a general treatment of the subject and not specific to facilities
Construction management
Facility management
Property management

References
Atkin, B. and Brooks, A. (2009) Total Facilities Management. 3rd edition, Wiley-Blackwell, Oxford and New York, 328pp.

External links
The Facilities Society

Non-profit organisations based in the United Kingdom
Organizations established in 2008